Pregnenolone sulfate (PS, PREGS) is an endogenous excitatory neurosteroid that is synthesized from pregnenolone. It is known to have cognitive and memory-enhancing, antidepressant, anxiogenic, and proconvulsant effects.

Biological activity
Pregnenolone sulfate is a neurosteroid with excitatory effects in the brain, acting as a potent negative allosteric modulator of the GABAA receptor and a weak positive allosteric modulator of the NMDA receptor. To a lesser extent, it also acts as a negative allosteric modulator of the AMPA, kainate, and glycine receptors, and may interact with the nACh receptors as well. In addition to its effects on ligand-gated ion channels, pregnenolone sulfate is an agonist of the sigma receptor, as well as an activator of the TRPM1 and TRPM3 channels. It may also interact with potassium channels and voltage-gated sodium channels and has been found to inhibit voltage-gated calcium channels.

Biochemistry

Biosynthesis

Pregnenolone sulfate is synthesized from pregnenolone via sulfation. Pregnenolone itself is produced from cholesterol via cholesterol side-chain cleavage enzyme.

Chemistry

Pregnenolone sulfate, also known as pregn-5-en-3β-ol-20-one 3β-sulfate, is a naturally occurring pregnane steroid and a derivative of cholesterol. It is the C3β sulfate ester of pregnenolone. A closely related steroid is dehydroepiandrosterone sulfate (DHEA-S), which is the C3β sulfate ester of dehydroepiandrosterone (DHEA).

References

AMPA receptor antagonists
GABAA receptor negative allosteric modulators
Glycine receptor antagonists
Kainate receptor antagonists
Neurosteroids
NMDA receptor agonists
Pregnanes
Sigma agonists
Sulfate esters